Liu Jing is a Chinese professional football player who plays as a midfielder for Changchun Jiuyin Loans. She studied at Beijing Normal University.

References

Living people
1998 births
Chinese women's footballers
China women's international footballers
Footballers at the 2020 Summer Olympics
Olympic footballers of China
Women's association football midfielders